Chionodes tannuolella is a moth in the family Gelechiidae. It is found in southern Siberia.

References

Chionodes
Moths described in 1917
Moths of Asia